Laguna Lake is a shallow natural lake at the head of the Chileno Valley. It retains some water year round.

It was included in the Rancho Laguna de San Antonio Mexican land grant, which was given to Bartolomé Bojorquez in 1845.

Laguna Lake is used extensively for migrating and breeding waterfowl and Agriculture. agr.

See also
List of lakes in California
List of lakes in the San Francisco Bay Area

References

Lakes of Marin County, California
Lakes of the San Francisco Bay Area
Lakes of Sonoma County, California
Lakes of California
Lakes of Northern California